Fishing Branch is a stream in Bates County in the U.S. state of Missouri.

Fishing Branch was named for the fact it was a favorite fishing spot.

See also
List of rivers of Missouri

References

Rivers of Bates County, Missouri
Rivers of Missouri